is a Japanese manga artist.

His best known work is Tsuribaka Nisshi with art by Kenichi Kitami. Yamasaki originally wrote screenplays for Toei, but was laid off and decided to pursue a career in manga instead. He has won both the Shogakukan and Kodansha Manga Award for Tsuri Baka Nikki and Okashina Futari respectively.

Works 
  drawn by Kenichi Kitami
  drawn by Kenichi Kitami
  drawn by Hideaki Hataji
  drawn by Mitsuru Adachi
  co-written with Sentarō Kubota and drawn by Mitsuyoshi Sonoda
  drawn by Mitsuru Adachi
  drawn by Mitsuru Adachi
  drawn by Mitsuru Adachi
  drawn by Kei Sadayasu
  drawn by Kinichi Kitama
  drawn by Kenichirō Takai
  drawn by Kenshi Hirokane
  drawn by Mitsuru Adachi
  drawn by Mamoru Uchiyama
  drawn by Mitsuo Hashimoto
  drawn by Kenji Okamura

References

External links
Japanese Interview with Jūzō Yamasaki

1941 births
Living people
Manga artists from Miyazaki Prefecture
Writers from Miyazaki Prefecture
People from Miyakonojō